This is the list of Philippine television drama series that originally aired or are set to air on GMA Network. Titles are sorted in the decade and the year of release, with the official international title included in parentheses.

1980s

1990s

1994

1995

1996

1997

1998

1999

2000s

2000

2001

2002

2003

2004

2005

2006

2007

2008

2009

2010s

2010

2011

2012

2013

2014

2015

2016

Unaired
 Boys Over Flowers
 Captain Barbell Meets Darna
 Familia de Honor
 Haram
 L.U.V. Pow
 Mrs. Snow White
 Rosang Agimat
 Sanggang Dikit
 Sine Novela's Ang Pinakamagandang Hayop sa Balat ng Lupa
 Sine Novela's Bakit Kay Tagal ng Sandali?
 Sine Novela's Muling Buksan ang Puso

See also
 List of Philippine drama series

References

 
GMA Network original drama series
GMA Network
Original drama series of GMA Network